Wakemup is an unincorporated community in Beatty Township, Saint Louis County, Minnesota, United States.

The community is located six miles north of Cook, near Saint Louis County Road 24 (Vermilion Drive).

Wakemup is located within the Kabetogama State Forest.

References

 Official State of Minnesota Highway Map – 2011/2012 edition

Unincorporated communities in Minnesota
Unincorporated communities in St. Louis County, Minnesota